Agyrta garleppi is a moth of the subfamily Arctiinae. It was described by Rothschild in 1912. It is found in Peru.

References

Moths described in 1912
Arctiinae of South America
Moths of South America